Mossneuk is a predominantly residential area in the South-West of the Scottish new town East Kilbride, in South Lanarkshire.

The area has very few facilities within in it, as it is served by shops and conveniences by the nearby areas of Greenhills, Hairmyres and Gardenhall. The area, however, has a community hall, a church and a primary school, care home and a park.
Mossneuk is the site of one of South Lanarkshire's 124 primary schools, the eponymous primary school - Mossneuk Primary School. As of 2011/2012, the school roll is approximately 450.

The area also contains one of the town's nine Church of Scotland churches - Mossneuk Parish Church. The church is one of the few Eco-Congregations in South Lanarkshire  and the minister, Dr. J. McPake is also the Chaplain to Mossneuk Primary School. The church hosts the 7th East Kilbride Girls' Brigade and 11th East Kilbride Boys' Brigade.

The area was also the site of the murder of local schoolboy, 16-year-old Jack Frew in May 2010

External links
 
 
 Mossneuk Primary School 2011 Handbook

Areas of East Kilbride